Chak Basawa is a village and union council of Mandi Bahauddin District in the Punjab province of Pakistan. It is located at 32°34'30N 73°33'30E and has an altitude of 219 metres (721 feet).

References

Union councils of Mandi Bahauddin District
Villages in Mandi Bahauddin District